Cecil Herbert "Pickles" Douglas (28 June 1886 – 30 September 1954) was an English boxing referee and a cricketer. He played for Essex between 1912 and 1919.

'Pickles' Douglas was a leading boxing referee for many years, handling contest including Jack Doyle v. Jack Petersen, 1933; the two Len Harvey v. Jack Petersen fights, 1933 and 1934; Primo Carnera v. George Cook, 1932; and George Cook v. Joe Beckett, 1922.

Family
He was the son of John H. Douglas, a prominent personality at the Covent Garden club, and brother of J. W. H. T. Douglas, who won the ABA amateur middle-weight boxing championship in 1905, the Olympic middleweight title in 1908 and afterwards captained the Essex county cricket eleven and England.

References

External links

1886 births
1954 deaths
English cricketers
Essex cricketers
Cricketers from Greater London
Sportspeople from London
British boxing referees
People from the London Borough of Hackney